Argises (You Were Late) is the last album released by popular Greek singer, Irini Merkouri. It was released in Greece in November 2006 by Sony BMG Greece.

Track listing
 "Kati Trehi" - 3:52
 "Miso Lepto" - 3:16
 "Pame Gi'alla" - 4:26
 "Den Ehoume Pia Tipota Na Poume" - 3:33
 "Ase Me Na Figo" - 3:36
 "Argises" - 4:01
 "Oti Pis" - 3:21
 "Kane Me Oti Thes" - 3:59
 "Ena Adio Kitrino Taxi" - 4:11
 "I Zoi Einai Oraia" - 4:23
 "Oute Fili Oute Ehthroi" - 3:33
 "Epanastato" - 3:40
 "Anemos" - 4:34

References

2006 albums
Greek-language albums
Irini Merkouri albums
Sony Music Greece albums